Jikawo River is a river of southwestern Ethiopia. It is a tributary of the Baro River, which it joins at latitude and longitude .

The river rises in Ethiopia, but in its lower course, it forms the border with South Sudan.

See also
List of rivers of Ethiopia
List of rivers of South Sudan

References 

Rivers of Ethiopia
Rivers of South Sudan
Ethiopia–South Sudan border
International rivers of Africa
Sobat River
Border rivers